Zanesville is an unincorporated community in Zanesville Township, Montgomery County, Illinois, United States. The community was established around 1828; it was originally named Leesburg after founder George Brewer's merchant friend Robert E. Lee. Settlers from Zanesville, Ohio changed the name to Zanesville. A post office opened in the community on June 26, 1838, under the name Hamlet; its name was changed to Zanesville in 1839.

References

Unincorporated communities in Montgomery County, Illinois
Unincorporated communities in Illinois